Kenneth Jackson (birth year unknown) is a former professional rugby league footballer who played in the 1940s, 1950s and 1960s.

Playing career

International honours
Ken Jackson won caps for Great Britain while at Oldham in 1957 against France (2 matches).

County Cup Final appearances
About Ken Jackson's time, there was Oldham's 2-12 defeat by Barrow in the 1954 Lancashire County Cup Final during the 1954–55 season at Station Road, Swinton on Saturday 23 October 1954, the 10-3 victory over St. Helens in the 1956 Lancashire County Cup Final during the 1956–57 season at Station Road, Swinton on Saturday 20 October 1956, and the 12-2 victory over St. Helens in the 1958 Lancashire County Cup Final during the 1958–59 season at Station Road, Swinton on Saturday 25 October 1958, he played left-, i.e. number 8, in Oldham's 13-8 victory over Wigan in the 1957 Lancashire County Cup Final during the 1957–58 season at Station Road, Swinton on Saturday 19 October 1957.

Testimonial match
Ken Jackson's Testimonial match at Oldham took place in 1960.

Honoured in Oldham
Jackson Mews in Oldham is named after Ken Jackson.

References

External links
!Great Britain Statistics at englandrl.co.uk (statistics currently missing due to not having appeared for both Great Britain, and England)
Statistics at rugbyleagueproject.org
Statistics at orl-heritagetrust.org.uk

Living people
English rugby league players
Oldham R.L.F.C. players
Great Britain national rugby league team players
Place of birth missing (living people)
Rugby league props
Year of birth missing (living people)